"Metropolis" is a single released in 1992 by The Future Sound of London under the alias 'Metropolis'.
It has a distinctly house feel with a funky break-beat and baseline with a choppy, repeating electroriff. Its unique sound had a major impact on early nineties electronica releases. It was made available to buy on their online shop in 2007, along with other rarities. It had a very big impact on house music at the time it was first released and set a standard for it and dance music in general.

Track listing 
 "Metropolis (Original)" (5:47)
 "Metropolis (Analog)" (3:59)
 "Hyporeel" (5:01)
 "Metropolis (Sueto Mix)" (5:35)

Audio
Below is a sample of the track.

References

External links
 

1992 songs
The Future Sound of London songs